Horace Abbott (July 29, 1806 – August 8, 1887) was an American iron manufacturer and banker.

He was born in Sudbury, Massachusetts to Alpheus Abbott and Lydia Fay, who were both farmers. After his father's death and subsequent blacksmithing apprenticeship, Abbott moved to Baltimore, Maryland in 1836 and purchased the Canton Iron Works in Canton, which specialized in the production of steamboat and railroad components. It was renamed the Abbott Iron Company. The company's 1850 mill was largest iron mill in the United States at that time.  It was said that iron plates were rolled here for shipment to New York City for John Ericsson's revolutionary new ship, the ironclad  which fought in the 1862 Battle of Hampton Roads during the Civil War.

He also was the founder of Baltimore's First National Bank, and a director of the Second National Bank of Baltimore and the Union Railroad of Baltimore, acquired by the Northern Central Railway in 1882, eventually becoming part of the Pennsylvania Railroad. He lived at his country estate "Abbotston" in northeast Baltimore near the present location of 33rd Street and The Alameda on one of the highest hills in the city near the village of Huntingdon (now Waverly) to the west and the Coldstream-Homestead-Montebello community off Harford Road to the east.  A Victorian mansion was constructed in the 1870s near the earlier Federal-era estate of "Montebello" of Samuel Smith, (1752–1839), U.S. Senator, Baltimore mayor, and commanding general of the Maryland militia during the War of 1812 during the British attack against Baltimore and a later Victorian mansion of the same name belonging to John Work Garrett, Civil War-era president of the Baltimore and Ohio Railroad.He also endowed the Abbott Memorial Presbyterian Church on Bank Street in the Highlandtown neighborhood of southeast Baltimore.

Abbott died in Baltimore in 1887.

References

 Who Was Who in America, Historical Volume, 1607–1896.  Chicago: Marquis Who's Who, 1963.

External links
  Appleton's Cyclopedia of American Biography, edited by James Grant Wilson, John Fiske and Stanley L. Klos. Six volumes, New York: D. Appleton and Company, 1887-1889 

1806 births
1887 deaths
Businesspeople from Baltimore
People from Sudbury, Massachusetts
American bankers
American ironmasters
19th-century American businesspeople